The 2021 Auburn Tigers football team represented Auburn University in the 2021 NCAA Division I FBS football season. The Tigers played their home games at Jordan–Hare Stadium in Auburn, Alabama, and competed in the Western Division of the Southeastern Conference (SEC). They were led by first-year head coach Bryan Harsin. They finished the season at 6–7, the program's first season finishing below .500 since 2012.

Previous season
The Tigers finished the 2020 season 6–5, 6–4 in SEC play to finish in third place in the Western Division. Head coach Gus Malzahn was fired at the end of the regular season after finishing 6–4 in his eighth season. Defensive coordinator Kevin Steele coached in the bowl game. The Tigers were invited to the Citrus Bowl where they lost to Northwestern. Boise State head coach, Bryan Harsin, was hired on December 22.

Offseason

Position key

Preseason

Spring game
The A-Day spring game was held on Saturday, April 17. Team Auburn defeated Team Tigers 17–3. Running back Tank Bigsby was named Offensive MVP, cornerback Trey Elston was named Defensive MVP, and kicker Anders Carlson was named Special Teams MVP.

Award watch lists
Listed in the order that they were released

SEC media days
The SEC Media Days were held July 19–22, 2021 at the Hyatt Regency Birmingham – The Wynfrey Hotel in Hoover, Alabama. Coach Bryan Harsin, quarterback Bo Nix, and linebacker Owen Pappoe spoke on Thursday, July 22.

Preseason All-SEC teams

Offense

1st team

Tank Bigsby – RB

Nick Brahms – C

3rd team

Bo Nix – QB

Defense

2nd team

Zakoby McClain – LB

Smoke Monday – DB

3rd team

Derick Hall – DL

Owen Pappoe – LB

Roger McCreary – DB

Specialists

2nd team

Tank Bigsby – AP

3rd team

Anders Carlson – PK

Staff

Cornelius Williams was fired as wide receivers coach after 4 games.
Mike Bobo was fired as Offensive Coordinator/Quarterbacks coach on November 29, 2021.

Schedule

Schedule Source:

Game summaries

Akron

Alabama State

at No. 10 Penn State

Georgia State

at LSU

No. 2 Georgia

at No. 17 Arkansas

No. 10 Ole Miss

at No. 14 Texas A&M

Mississippi State

at South Carolina

No. 3 Alabama

No. 20 Houston (Birmingham Bowl)

Rankings

References

Auburn
Auburn Tigers football seasons
Auburn Tigers football